Wolfgang Viechtbauer is a statistician. He is an associate professor of methodology and statistics at the Maastricht University in the Faculty of Health, Medicine and Life Sciences and Faculty of Psychology and Neuroscience. His most influential work has been focused on the field of meta-analysis and evidence synthesis.

Education 
Viechtbauer completed a M.A. (2002) and a Ph.D. (2004) at the University of Illinois at Urbana–Champaign. His master's thesis was titled Bias of certain variance estimators in meta-analysis and his dissertation was titled Choosing between the fixed-, random-, and mixed-effects model in meta-analysis: an analysis of existing and new model selection methods. His doctoral advisor was David Budescu.

Career 
Viechtbauer is an associate professor of methodology and statistics at the Maastricht University in the Faculty of Health, Medicine and Life Sciences and Faculty of Psychology and Neuroscience.

Selected works

References

External links 
 
 

Living people
Year of birth missing (living people)
Place of birth missing (living people)
21st-century German mathematicians
Biostatisticians
Computer scientists
Academic staff of Maastricht University
University of Illinois Urbana-Champaign alumni
Nationality missing